Qué Más Da may refer to:

 "Qué Más Da", a song by Ha*Ash from their live album Primera Fila: Hecho Realidad
 "Qué Más Da", the Spanish-language version of "I Don't Care" (Ricky Martin song)